Nédia Semedo (born 14 November 1978 in the Algarve region) is a retired Portuguese athlete who competed in the middle-distance events. She represented her country at the 2004 Summer Olympics narrowly missing the semifinals. Her biggest successes are the silver medal at the 2001 Summer Universiade and the sixth place at the 2002 European Championships.

Competition record

Personal bests
Outdoor
400 metres – 54.87 (Seia 2003)
800 metres – 2:00.49 (Lisbon 2004)
1000 metres – 2:40.11 (Lisbon 2004)
1500 metres – 4:09.46 (Funchal 2001)
One mile – 4:36.78 (Lisbon 1999)

Indoor
400 metres – 54.78 (Espinho 2005)
800 metres – 2:01.11 (Espinho 2003)
1000 metres – 2:41.55 (Madrid 2005)
1500 metres – 4:13.58 (Espinho 2003)

References

1978 births
Living people
Portuguese female middle-distance runners
Athletes (track and field) at the 2004 Summer Olympics
Olympic athletes of Portugal
Universiade medalists in athletics (track and field)
Universiade silver medalists for Portugal